Élodie Touffet (born 17 February 1980) is a road cyclist from France. She represented France at the 2005, 2007 and 2008 UCI Road World Championships. She also represented Tahiti at the 2022 Championships in Australia, as part of the mixed relay team, where Tahiti had an invitation to participate in the event.

References

External links
 profile at Procyclingstats.com

1980 births
French female cyclists
Living people
Place of birth missing (living people)